Miagrammopes thwaitesii, is a species of spider of the genus Miagrammopes. It is native to India and Sri Lanka.

See also
 List of Uloboridae species

References

External links
A List of Spiders captured by Professor E. Perceval Wright, M.D., in the province of Lucca, in Tuscany, in the summer of 1863, with characters of such Species as appear to be new or little known to Arachnologists

Uloboridae
Endemic fauna of Sri Lanka
Spiders of Asia
Spiders described in 1870